The 2004–05 European Badminton Circuit season started in September 2004 and ended in April 2005.

Results

Winners

Performance by countries
Tabulated below are the Circuit performances based on countries. Only countries who have won a title are listed:

References 

European Badminton Circuit
European Badminton Circuit
European Badminton Circuit seasons